List of all franchised brands, exclusive licensing, and entities – past and present – of Grupo Cisneros:

Key Cisneros dates 
 1929 – 1953: D. Cisneros & Cia., a small material-transport business
 1953 – 1970: Cisneros Group of Companies
 1970 – 2013: Cisneros Group of Companies
 2013 – present: Grupo Cisneros
 2011 – present: Cisneros Interactive
 March 2013 – present: Cisneros company split into three business divisions
 Cisneros Media
 Cisneros Interactive
 Cisneros Real Estate
 April 2014 – present: Cisneros Media Distribution, global distributor of entertainment content
Philanthropies
 1968: Diego Cisneros Foundation
 1970 – present: Fundación Cisneros
 2008 – present: Fundación Tropicalia
 2009 – present: Cisneros Corporate Social Responsibility (CSR) Unit

A
 Actualización de Maestros en Educación (AME):
 1998, Fundación Cisneros launches the first professional development program for teachers in Latin America via satellite television and internet
 2008, expansion by Fundación Cisneros and Barrick Gold Corporation
 ADOPEM Bank: 2016, Fundación Tropicalia and ADOPEM Bank launches “Miches Emprende”, a fund to support entrepreneurs in Miches, Dominican Republic
 Adsmovil, mobile advertising network in Latin America based in Bogota; see Redmas
 All-American Bottling: 1982, soft-drink bottling
 Aluyana, C.A.: 1988, aluminum smelting plant in Venezuela
 America Online, Inc.: 1998, Internet service to Latin America
 Americatel: 1993, digital communication trunk service in Venezuela
 Apple Inc.: 1984, exclusive franchise rights in Venezuela
 Audio.Ad: 
 2014, RedMas audio advertising network in Latin America and US Hispanic market
 2015, launches in Brazil
 2016, launches in United States

B
 Backus and Johnston: 2002, 20% stake, brewery in Peru
 Burger King: 1980, exclusive franchise rights in Venezuela

C
 CADA Automercado: 1975, Venezuela’s first supermarket chain
 Caracol: 1997, broadcast television network and TV production company in Colombia
 Caribbean Communications Network Ltd.: 1994, communications and media company in Trinidad and Tobago
 Cervecería Regional: 1992, acquisition, brewery and beer distributor in Venezuela
 Cherry Blossom (candy), 1982, exclusive franchise rights in Venezuela
 Chilevision: 1992, acquisition, Chilean TV network
 China Central Television (CCTV): 2008, distribution agreement for the 2008 Summer Olympics in Beijing; 2012, agreement at NATPE to exchange documentary assets
 Cinemakit: 1985, Venezuelan video and film production company
 Cisneros Media: Cisneros Media production studios in Miami; see Cisneros Studios
 Cisneros Media Distribution (CMD):
 Cisneros Studios: 2014, rebranding of Cisneros Media production studios in Miami; see Cisneros Media
 Cisneros Television: 1996-2001, pay-television channels for international distribution; see Claxson Interactive Group Inc.
 Claxson Interactive Group Inc.: 2001, merger of Cisneros Television, Ibero-American Media Partners, and El Sitio, multimedia provider of branded entertainment content to Spanish- and Portuguese-speaking audiences worldwide
 Cl@se: 
 1996, pan-regional Spanish educational television channel across Latin America, part of DirecTV Latin America deal
 2006, expands to Mexico via Mexico’s Latin American Institute for Educational Communication
 2007, expands to Peru via Peru's Ministry of Education
 2008, expands to Costa Rica via Ministry of Education of Costa Rica and Cable Tica
 2008, expands in Mexico via ILCE reach agreement
 2009, expands to Dominican Republic via Wind Telecom and the Ministry of Education of Dominican Republic
 Comarex: 2016, Cisneros Media Distribution international representation deal, Mexican distributor
 Commerce Union Bank: 1982
 Coyote Media House: 2014, investment, production company specializing in creating short form digital video for brands
 Creative Artists Agency (CAA): 2016, representation agreement with for Cisneros Media

D
 Deezer: 2016, Audio.Ad advertising sales deal, music streaming service in Colombia
 DirecTV Latin America: 1995–present, with Hughes Electronics Corporation, all-digital direct-to-home satellite television service in Latin America
 Digital Equipment Corporation: 1983, exclusive franchise rights in Venezuela

E
 Eccelera Holdings: 2000, Brazilian-based investment company focused on telecommunications, media, and technology
 eHow en Español, 2014: partnership of Cisneros Interactive and Demand Media for the branded digital advertising solutions in Latin America
 El Sitio: YYYY-2001; see Claxson Interactive Group Inc.
 Evenflo: 1984, acquisition, baby and children products

F
 Facebook: 2017, Cisneros Interactive becomes official reseller in Ecuador, Paraguay, Bolivia, and Venezuela
 FLUVIP: 2015, Cisneros Interactive investment, influencer marketing company focused on Latin America; 2016, launches in Argentina
 Four Seasons Aspen: 2015, real estate development
 Four Seasons Hotels and Resorts: 2013, letter of intent for Tropicalia
 French's: 1982, exclusive franchise rights in Venezuela

G
 Galerías Preciados: 1984, Spain's largest department store chain
 Gaveplast: 1970, produces plastic crates, cases and other materials for the retail market and beer and carbonated soft drink industries in South America

H
 Hamilton Watch Company: 1939, exclusive franchise rights in Venezuela
 Helados Club Ice Cream Company, later known as Helados Tío Rico, S.A., also known as Tío Rico: 1952, largest manufacturer of ice cream in Venezuela
 Helene Curtis: 1976, via Laboratorios Fisa beauty products
 Hispanic Broadcasting Corporation: 2002, acquisition by Univision, radio broadcasting company in the U.S.; see Univision Radio

I
 Ibero-American Media Partners: 1997-2001, investment fund focused on media, with Hicks, Muse, Tate & Furst, Inc.; see Claxson Interactive Group Inc.
 Ibero-American Radio Chile: 1998, acquires, consolidates, and operates radio stations in Chile
 Imagen Satelital: 1997, acquisition by Cisneros Television, pay-television channels in Argentina

J

K
 Kontextua: 2012, acquisition and merged into RedMas, online advertising network focusing on display, in-text, and in-image ad formats; see RedMas

L
 Laboratorios Fisa, 1976, produces and distributes beauty products, includes Helene Curtis brand
 Latcel: 2004, joint venture of Venevisión International and WAU Móvil, wireless content services for U.S. Hispanic market; 2011, becomes mobile advertising network targeting the US Hispanic market; see Cisneros Interactive
 Liquid Carbonic: 1944, produces carbon dioxide and related products
 Los Leones del Caracas: 2001, acquisition, baseball franchise in Venezuela

M
 Maxy’s: 1983, Sears, Roebuck & Company department stores are renamed Maxy's, the country’s largest retail chain store in Venezuela; see Sears, Roebuck & Company
 Millennial Media: 2013, strategic partnership with Adsmovil, independent mobile advertising and data platform to commercialize advertising solutions in Latin America
 Minalba: 1986, acquisition, mineral water
 Miss Venezuela: 1981, beauty pageant
 Moat: 2015, partnership with Adsmovil to measure viewability
 MOBIUS.LAB Productions: 2015, Cisneros Media Distribution launches a content development platform with Getty Images Latin America
 Mobly: 2013-2015, Cisneros Interactive investment Brazilian home furnishing web store, part of Rocket Internet
 Movida: 2006, first Hispanic mobile virtual network operator in the United States.
 MuchMusic Argentina: 1998, Cisneros Television acquires music television channel in Argentina and the Southern Cone

N
 Norge: 1939, exclusive franchise rights in Venezuela
 Novulu: 2009, Venevisión International entertainment portal

O
 O’Caña Distributors: 1974, liquor distribution company
 Open English: 2013-2014, joint venture of Cisneros Interactive and Open English, launch Open English in the United States, targeting US Hispanics and Puerto Rico

P
 Paternoster Square, 1988: large-scale office and retail complex development in London, managed in partnership with Park Tower Realty, Greycoat and Mitsubishi Estates.
 Pepsi-Cola: 1940, exclusive franchise rights in Venezuela
 Pizza Hut: 1983, exclusive franchise rights in Venezuela
 Playboy TV International: 1998, partnership by Cisneros Television with Playboy Enterprises, Inc.
 Proyectos Pet, C.A.: 1982, bottle supplier for Hit and Pepsi-Cola beverages in Venezuela
 Pueblo Xtra International: 1993, supermarket chain in Puerto Rico, U.S. Virgin Islands, and South Florida

Q

R
 Radiovision: 1974, Venezuela's first national radio network
 RedMas: 2011, advertising network and mobile ad studio; 2012 became part of Adsmovil; see Adsmovil
 REO Trucks: 1939, exclusive franchise rights in Venezuela
 Rodven Group of Companies: 1980, manufactures records, cassettes, video

S
 San Bernardo: 1986, acquisition, mineral water
 Sears, Roebuck & Company: 1983, Sears department stores are renamed Maxy’s, the country’s largest retail chain store in Venezuela; see Maxy's
 Siente Music: 2006, joint venture of Venevisión International and Universal Music Latino (part of Universal Music Group)
 Spalding Company: 1984, acquisition, sporting goods company
 Spark Media: 2016, FLUVIP acquires a 60% stake, marketing company in Brazil
 Story.Ad: 2015, launched by RedMas, native ad platform
 Studebaker: 1947, exclusive franchise rights in Venezuela

T
 Tail Target: 2015, joint venture of Cisneros Interactive and Tail Target, data management platform company based in Brazil but located across Latin America and U.S.
 Televisión Latina: 1982, distributor of Venevisión to U.S. Hispanic market
 Triton Digital: 2016, Audio.Ad exclusive ad sales representation agreement, audio streaming providers and operators of A2X, an audio ad exchange
 Tropicalia: 2009, Dominican Republic real estate development with environmental and socially responsible tourism slant
 Tu clase, tu país: 2014, teacher training program in Dominican Republic and Venezuela

U
 United Nations Population Fund: 2015, agreement signed by Cisneros Media to contribute to the prevention of teen pregnancy through awareness campaigns
 UN Women: 2013, memorandum of understanding to contribute to gender equality and the empowerment of women through content production
 UNICEF: 2012, agreement to contribute to peace education and adolescent development in Venezuela through sports and art
 Univision: 1992-2007, acquisition, part of three-entity consortium with Jerry Perenchio and Emilio Azcarraga Jean
 Univision Radio: 2002, radio station; see Hispanic Broadcasting Corporation

V
 Venemobile: 2007, produces and distributes mobile games and applications
 VeneMovies: 2006, first full-featured Spanish-language film channel in the U.S.
 VeneMusic: 2003, Latin music label
 Venevisión: 1961–present
 Venevisión Continental: 2000, pay-television network targeting global Spanish-speaking population
 Venevisión International Theater: 2001, production and distribution of Spanish-language plays
 Venevisión Plus: 2007, Spanish-language 24/7 worldwide pay-TV channel
 Venevisión Plus Dominicana: 2010, Dominican Republic
 Venevisión Studios: 2004, production facility in Miami
 Videomovil Color, C.A.: 1988, production company
 VMAS TV: 2012, pay-TV channel in Colombia

W

X
 Xapp Media: 2016, Audio.Ad launches interactive audio ads

Y
 Yahoo!: 2012, RedMas becomes Yahoo!’s exclusive advertising representative in Venezuela, Peru, Ecuador and Dominican Republic
 Yukery Venezolana de Alimentos: 1986, producer and distributor of fruit juices, ketchup, chocolate, baby food, and pasteurized milk

Z
 Zhejiang Huace Film & TV Co.: 2012, co-production deal of telenovela in China

References 

Cisneros